City Hall Historic District may refer to:
 City Hall Historic District (Cambridge, Massachusetts)
 City Hall Historic District (Lowell, Massachusetts)
 City Hall Historic District (Battle Creek, Michigan), listed on the National Register of Historic Places in Calhoun County, Michigan
 City Hall Historic District (Rochester, New York)